Vostochnoye Izmaylovo District is an administrative district (raion), one of the sixteen in Eastern Administrative Okrug of the federal city of Moscow, Russia. As of the 2010 Census, its population was 76,312, up from 75,450 recorded during the 2002 Census.

Municipal status
As a municipal division, it is incorporated as Vostochnoye Izmaylovo Municipal Okrug.

References

Notes

Sources



Districts of Moscow
Eastern Administrative Okrug